Edgar Lucian Malvaney (1896–1970) was an architect in Jackson, Mississippi. He designed many buildings, including several listed on the National Register of Historic Places including the War Memorial Building, which is listed on the National Register of Historic Places in Hinds County as a contributing property to the Old Capitol. Malvaney worked for Theodore Link, C. H. Lindley and was involved in a partnership with his cousin Emmett J. Hull before opening his own firm.

Malvaney was born in Jackson, Mississippi. He spent one year at Mississippi A & M University before joining the American Expeditionary Force during World War I and serving in France and going over to France to fight during WWI. He continued his studies there before returning to Jackson in 1919. He received an architecture degree from Washington University in St. Louis in 1922. He partnered with Hull at Hull & Malvaney in 1926 and opened his own firm in 1931.

He designed several schools, hospitals, government buildings, and commercial buildings.

His son, E. Louis Malvaney (1924 - 2014), also became an architect.

Work
Contributing property in the Carthage Historic District in Carthage, Mississippi
Contributing property to the Downtown Waynesboro Historic District in Waynesboro, Mississippi 
Vaiden High School at 504 Mulberry Street in Vaiden, Mississippi, listed on the National Register of Historic Places
Carver Central High School, several of its brick buildings, in Collins, Mississippi. Listed on the NRHP
War Memorial

References

1896 births
1970 deaths
People from Jackson, Mississippi
Mississippi State University alumni
Sam Fox School of Design & Visual Arts alumni
Architects from Mississippi
Washington University in St. Louis alumni